Barbara Rosiek (June 25, 1959 – April 27, 2020) was a Polish writer, poet and clinical psychologist.

Early years

Rosiek was born in Częstochowa. She made her literary debut in 1985 as the author of "Pamiętnik Narkomanki" (English: ‘Diary of a drug addict’), a book she started when she was 14 and finished while studying, describing her life dominated by her struggle with drug addiction. Breaking the habit was a long and difficult process for Rosiek which required perseverance and strength. She won and finished college.

Career

Rosiek was a clinical psychologist. She worked in hospitals in Lubiniec and Częstochowa as well as in the Society of Friends of Families and Friends of Children Addicted but due to poor health, Barbara Rosiek stopped working professionally. In 1993 she became a member of the department of Cracow Polish Writers Union. She was interested in philosophy, even more attracted to travelling. When asked what was the most important thing in her life, she replied: love, friendship, peace of mind. Writing was a form of therapy for the author, which made her very calm and thanks to this she was able to survive many hard periods. She could not imagine life without possibility to express her anxiety and the attitude to her own experiences. She claimed it was also kind of spiritual contact with God, and the dialogue with the rest of the world.
In addition to the "Pamiętnik narkomanki" which achieved number of theater-settings, Rosiek has written few other books like "Byłam schizofreniczką” (English: ‘I was schizophrenic’) which is an authentic record of the writer’s battle against the disease. Her artistic achievements also include some volumes of poetry. In 2002, the author was honoured for lifetime with Silver Medal of Cambridge. Receipt of this medal is associated with replacing a biography of person awarded in the international edition of the  "Who's Who 2000-2100”.

Publications

Novels

 Pamiętnik narkomanki (1985)
 Kokaina
 Byłam schizofreniczką
 Alkohol, prochy i ja
 W poszukiwaniu ducha (2007)
 Kokaina. Zwierzenia narkomanki
 Poganiacze Chleba (2008)
 Życie w hospicjum (2010)
 Oddział otwarty (2012)

Poetry

 Byłam mistrzynią kamuflażu
 Jak ptak przytwierdzony do skały
 A imię jego Alemalem
 Wdowa
 Krzyk
 Miłość niedokończona
 Uwierzyć i Melancholia
 Żar miłości
 Ciało na kracie
 Być poetą

Bibliography 
 Polish bibliography 1988 - 2001

References

http://www.gazetacz.com.pl/artykul.php?id=1925&idm=186
https://web.archive.org/web/20150620134806/http://www.petlaczasu.pl/barbara-rosiek/a00000573

1959 births
People from Częstochowa
2020 deaths
20th-century Polish novelists
21st-century Polish novelists
Polish women novelists
Polish women poets
20th-century Polish women writers
21st-century Polish women writers
20th-century Polish poets
21st-century Polish poets